Acharya is a genus of moths of the family Erebidae described by Frederic Moore in 1882.

Species
Acharya crassicornis Moore, 1882
Acharya franconia (C. Swinhoe, 1903)

References

Calpinae
Noctuoidea genera